The Sahebgharaniyeh Palace (Persian: کاخ صاحبقرانیه) is a palace in Tehran, Iran. Built in 1850 by the order of Nasereddin Shah Qajar, It is one of the only Qajar buildings in the Niavaran complex.

History 
Nasereddin Shah Qajar ordered the construction of the palace in 1850 in two floors, and in the 39th year of his rule he gave himself the title "Sahebgharan" and gave the name "Sahebgharaniyeh" to the place. Mozaffareddin Shah Qajar signed the first constitution of Iran in this place. Fawzia Fuad and Mohammad Reza Pahlavi were also scheduled to have their wedding in this palace, which was cancelled due the coldness of the weather. it was also used as the working office of the Shah for several years before the revolution.

Parts of Bitter Coffee and Kamalolmolk (film) and were filmed in this palace.

Gallery

References 

Palaces in Tehran
Buildings of the Qajar period
19th-century establishments in Iran